Clément Petit (born 11 January 1998) is a Belgian football player. He plays for RFC Molenbaix.

Club career
He made his Belgian First Division A debut for Mouscron on 3 March 2018 in a game against Lokeren.

Ahead of the 2019-20 season, Petit joined R.F.C. Tournai.

References

External links
 

1998 births
Sportspeople from Tournai
Footballers from Hainaut (province)
Living people
Belgian footballers
Belgium youth international footballers
Association football forwards
Royal Excel Mouscron players
R.F.C. Tournai players
Belgian Pro League players
Francs Borains players